Satyapurna Tirtha (1648 - 1726), (IAST:Satyapūrṇa Tīrtha), was a Hindu philosopher, scholar and saint. He served as the pontiff of Shri Uttaradi Math from 1706–1726. He was the 22nd in succession from Madhvacharya. Satyapurna Tirtha ruled the pontificate with a remarkable distinction. His life was a saga of supreme spiritual achievements.

Life
Satyapriya was initially given ashrama by Satyapurna Tirtha. When Sri Satyapurna Tirtha fell ill, and Sri Satyapriya Tirtha was on tour to propagation of Dvaita Philosophy, he ordained sanyasa to Satya Vijaya Tirtha. After 11 years reign as peetadhipathi of the Pontificate he made over the Samsthana to Satyapriya Tirtha. From that time onwards Satyapriya Tirtha began to call Arani by the name Satyavijayanagaram. Even now it is well known by that name. The Brindavana of Satyapurna Tirtha is in Kolpur.

References

Bibliography
 

 

Indian Hindus
Madhva religious leaders
Dvaita Vedanta
Dvaitin philosophers
1726 deaths
Uttaradi Math